The 1982 World Sportscar Championship was the 30th season of FIA World Sportscar Championship racing. It featured the 1982 World Endurance Championship for Drivers, which was contested over an eight-round series, and the 1982 World Endurance Championship for Manufacturers, which was contested over five rounds held concurrently with the first five rounds of the Drivers Championship. The Drivers’ title was open to Group C Sports Cars, Group B GT Cars, Group 6 Two-Seater Racing Cars, Group 5 Special Production Cars, Group 4 GT Cars, Group 3 GT Cars, Group 2 Touring Cars and IMSA GTX, GTO and GTU cars. The Manufacturers title was limited to Group C Sports Cars and Group B GT Cars only. The series ran from 18 April 1982 to 17 October 1982.

The World Endurance Championship for Drivers was won by Jacky Ickx driving a Porsche 956 and the World Endurance Championship for Manufacturers was awarded to Porsche.

Schedule

† - Points were awarded for the World Endurance Championship for Drivers only.

Season results

Races

Drivers Championship
Points towards the 1982 World Endurance Championship for Drivers were awarded on a 20-15-12-10-8-6-4-3-2-1 basis to drivers of the ten top placed cars at each round, regardless of class. Bonus points were also awarded to the drivers of those cars on the following basis:
 0 points to Category I (Group C, Group 5 over 2000cc, IMSA GTX over 2000cc)
 1 point to Category II (Group B over 2000cc, Group 6 under 2000cc, Group 5 under 2000cc, Group 4 over 2000cc, IMSA GTO)
 2 points to Category III (IMSA GTU, Group 2 over 2000cc, Group 3 over 2000cc)
 3 points to Category IV (Group B under 2000cc, Group 4 under 2000cc, Group 2 under 2000cc, Group 3 under 2000cc).
Only the best six round results could be retained by each driver. Any driver transferring between cars during a race was ineligible to score points and a driver was required to complete at least 30 percent of the car's distance to be awarded points.
  
Belgian driver Jacky Ickx won the title at the wheel of a Porsche 956 entered by Rothmans Porsche.

A total of 125 drivers scored points in the Drivers Championship.

Manufacturers Championship

Points towards the 1982 World Endurance Championship for Manufacturers were scored only by Group C and Group B cars on a 20-15-12-10-8-6-4-3-2-1 basis for the first ten finishers in these two classes combined. Only the best placed car from each manufacturer was eligible to score points and only the best four round results could be retained by each manufacturer.

Note: The FIA awarded manufacturers placings to the combined engine/chassis unit. For cars competing with a different make of engine to that of the chassis, the FIA gave prominence to the engine over the chassis when naming a “Manufacturer”.

The cars
The following models contributed towards the net point scores of their respective manufacturers.
 Porsche 956 & Porsche 930 
 Rondeau M382 
 Nimrod NRA/C2
 WM P82
 Ford C100
 Sauber SHS C6
 Lola T610
 Cougar C01

References

External links
 1982 FIA World Endurance Championship (Drivers standings), www.classicscars.com
 1982 FIA World Endurance Championship (Makes standings), www.classicscars.com
 1982 FIA World Endurance Championship (Race results), www.classicscars.com
 1982 World Endurance Championship race results, www.wsrp.cz
 1982 World Endurance Championship – images Retrieved from www.racingsportscars.com on 18 September 2009

World Sportscar Championship seasons
World Sportscar Championship